Pleotomus pallens is a species of firefly in the beetle family Lampyridae. It is found in Central America and North America. The female firefly of this species emits a brighter form of light than the male and this light decreases after she lays eggs; after she has performed this duty, she dies.

References

Further reading

 
 

Lampyridae
Bioluminescent insects
Articles created by Qbugbot
Beetles described in 1866